During the 1935–36 season Bologna Associazione Giuoco del Calcio competed in Serie A, Coppa Italia and Mitropa Cup.

Summary 

The club won its 3rd title ever after a closed race managed by Hungarian coach Weisz. With 40 points over top of the table passed A.S. Roma (39), Torino (38) third place, Ambrosiana (36) and Juventus fifth with 35 points.

Squad

Competitions

Serie A

League table

Matches

Coppa Italia

Round of 32

Eightfinals

Mitropa Cup

Eightfinals

Statistics

Squad statistics

Players statistics

Appearances
34.Michele Andreolo 
1.Amedeo Biavati 
9.Aldo Donati 
32.Giordano Corsi 
31.Francisco Fedullo 
34.Dino Fiorini 
34.Felice Gasperi 
34.Mario Gianni 
26.Bruno Maini 
27.Mario Montesanto 
11.Gerardo Ottani 
34.Carlo Reguzzoni 
31.Raffaele Sansone 
28.Angelo Schiavio 
8.Alcide Ivan Violi

Goalscorers
4.*Michele Andreolo 
4.*Francisco Fedullo 
5.*Bruno Maini 
4.*Gerardo Ottani 
3.*Carlo Reguzzoni 
8.*Raffaele Sansone 
11.*Angelo Schiavio 
2.*Alcide Ivan Violi

References

Bibliography

External links 
 
 

Bologna F.C. 1909 seasons
Italian football championship-winning seasons
Bologna